USS Edith II (SP-296), later USS SP-296, was a United States Navy patrol vessel in commission from 1917 to 1919.

Edith II was built by the Great Lakes Boat Building Corporation at Milwaukee, Wisconsin, as a civilian motorboat of the same name in 1917. The United States Navy acquired her from her owner, Carnot M. Ward of Whippany, New Jersey, in May 1917 for World War I service as a patrol vessel and commissioned her as USS Edith II (SP-296). In 1918, her name was changed to USS SP-296.

Edith II was returned to Ward in early 1919.

References 
Navy History and Heritage Command Online Library of Selected Images: Edith II (American Motor Boat, 1917). Served as USS Edith II (SP-296) and USS SP-296 in 1917-1919
NavSource Online: Section Patrol Craft Photo Archive SP-296 ex-Edith II (SP 296)

Patrol vessels of the United States Navy
World War I patrol vessels of the United States
Ships built in Milwaukee
1917 ships